is a role-playing video game developed by Birthday and published by Namco for Famicom, in November 1988 in Japan.

External links 
 Kaijū Monogatari at Giant Bomb

Nintendo Entertainment System games
Nintendo Entertainment System-only games
Role-playing video games
1988 video games
Namco games
Top-down video games
Fantasy video games
Japan-exclusive video games
Kaiju video games
Video games developed in Japan